A Childhood is a 2015 French drama film written and directed by Philippe Claudel.

Plot 
Jimmy is 13 years old and lives in a small dilapidated town in eastern France. At a young age, he has to stand on his own feet and assume the primary care role for his younger brother Kévin. During the summer, Jimmy is forced to grow up quickly as he  hovers between his errant mother and his domineering criminal stepfather.

Cast 
 Alexi Mathieu as Jimmy 
 Angélica Sarre as Pris 
 Pierre Deladonchamps as Duke 
 Jules Gauzelin as Kévin  	
 Patrick d'Assumçao as The teacher
 Fayssal Benbahmed as Mouss 
 Catherine Matisse as Lila  
 Lola Dubois as Lison  
 Philippe Claudel as The tennis coach

Production 
Filming took place from 9 June 2014 til 1 August.

Reception

It received the Best Film Award at the Chicago International Film Festival.

References

External links 
 

2015 films
2010s coming-of-age drama films
2010s French-language films
Films directed by Philippe Claudel
Films produced by Margaret Ménégoz
French coming-of-age drama films
2015 drama films
2010s French films